All the Living is the 2009 debut novel of American author C. E. Morgan.

Writing and development
Morgan wrote the novel over the course of a fourteen day period.

Reception

Critical reception
The novel received positive reviews. Critics writing for Tin House and The Boston Globe highlighted the quality of Morgan's prose.

Honors
The novel was a finalist for the Hemingway Foundation/PEN Award.

Reception

2009 American novels
2009 debut novels
Novels set in Kentucky
Farrar, Straus and Giroux books